Plungė District Municipality (Samogitian: Plongės rajuona savivaldībė) is one of 60 municipalities in Lithuania.

Tourism and pilgrimage
Major tourist attraction is Lake Plateliai and nearby town Plateliai. All year round and especially in summer, this municipality attracts many pilgrims from all over the world to its annual Christian celebrations in Žemaičių Kalvarija.

Municipality council
Plungė District Municipality Council is the governing body of the Plungė District Municipality. it is responsible for municipality laws. The council is composed of 25 member elected for four-year terms.

The council is the member of The Association of Local Authorities in Lithuania.

Mayors 

1995 – Antanas Lapukas
1997 – Aleksandras Lukas
2000 – Vytautas Jonutis
2003 – Vigantas Danilavičius
2004 – Algirdas Pečiulis
2007 – Elvyra Valerija Lapukienė

Elderships 
There are 11 elderships in Plungė district municipality:
Alsėdžiai eldership
Babrungas eldership
Kuliai eldership
Nausodis eldership
Paukštakiai eldership
Plateliai eldership
Plungė City eldership
Stalgėnai eldership
Šateikiai eldership
Žemaičių Kalvarija eldership
Žlibinai eldership

References

 
Municipalities of Telšiai County
Municipalities of Lithuania